Protection Cove is a bay, 3 nautical miles (6 km) wide, lying at the east side of Cape Klovstad where it forms the head of Robertson Bay, northern Victoria Land. First charted by British Antarctic Expedition, 1898–1900, under C. E. Borchgrevink, and so named because the expedition ship Southern Cross found protection here during a gale.

References

Coves of Antarctica
Landforms of Victoria Land
Pennell Coast